Franciscan Missionaries of Our Lady University, formerly Our Lady of the Lake College, is a private Catholic university in Baton Rouge, Louisiana. It was founded in 1923 and is sponsored by the Franciscan Missionaries of Our Lady, North American Province. The university has an enrollment of approximately 1700 students. It offers associate's, bachelor's, and master's degrees in programs such as nursing, health sciences, humanities, behavioral sciences, and arts and sciences.

History

Franciscan Missionaries of Our Lady University has evolved from the Our Lady of the Lake School of Nursing, established in 1923 by the Franciscan Missionaries of Our Lady.  The School of Nursing began in conjunction with the establishment of Our Lady of the Lake Sanitarium in the Capitol Lake area of downtown Baton Rouge, Louisiana.  The school was an integral part of the new hospital's program of service to the community.

Five students from the St. Francis Sanitarium in Monroe, Louisiana, formed the nucleus of the first class of nine students.  The students lived, attended classes and cared for patients in the hospital overlooking Capitol Lake.  Upon completion of three calendar years of education, the students were awarded a diploma in nursing.

The curriculum was revised over the years to incorporate advances in medical science, nursing science, nursing practice, and nursing education.  In 1960, in response to the changing community health needs and the prevailing nursing shortage, the School of Nursing was the first school in the South to revise its curriculum by shortening its program from three calendar years to 27 consecutive months.  Recruitment to the diploma program was intensified, enrollment increased and the school continued to grow.

During the 1970s, major changes began to occur in the student population.  Along with a decline in residential students, there was a gradual but persistent increase in the number of non-traditional students (23 years of age and older) seeking admission to the nursing program.  By the close of the decade, the School of Nursing became a commuter school and no longer offered on-campus housing.  This coincided with the relocation of Our Lady of the Lake Regional Medical Center to its present site on Essen Lane.

Further development in the area of academic programming began in the 1980s and 1990s.  In response to current trends in nursing education and licensure, the faculty began exploring options to position nursing education within the collegiate setting.  In 1989, the process culminated with the decision of the Franciscan Sisters and the medical center administration to transition to a degree-granting institution of higher education.  In May 1990, Our Lady of the Lake College of Nursing and Allied Health was registered with the Louisiana Secretary of State and the Louisiana Board of Regents.  Within the next few years, the college began offering Associate of Science degrees in radiologic technology and general studies, in addition to nursing.  In July 1995, the college was officially renamed Our Lady of the Lake College.

The late 1990s and early years of the new millennium were an exciting time of expansion for the college.  In 1998, the college was approved as a Carnegie Level II institution to offer baccalaureate degrees. By 2005, the college was granted approval for master's level programs in nurse anesthesia, nursing, and physician assistant studies.

In February 2006, Dr. Sandra S. Harper joined the college as president.  In 2007, she led a reorganization of the college's academic programs resulting in two schools: The School of Arts, Sciences and Health Professions and The School of Nursing. Harper left Our Lady of the Lake College in August 2013 to head McMurry University in Abilene, Texas.  Dr. Tina Holland was named the president in April 2014. Soon thereafter, the college would become a university.

References

External links
Official website

Educational institutions established in 1923
Catholic universities and colleges in Louisiana
Universities and colleges accredited by the Southern Association of Colleges and Schools
Universities and colleges in Baton Rouge, Louisiana
1923 establishments in Louisiana